Peter Rogers  (1914–2009) was an English film producer.

Peter Rogers may also refer to:

Peter Rogers (businessman) (born 1947), Chief Executive, Babcock International Group plc
Peter Rogers (politician) (born 1940), Welsh Conservative politician
Peter Rogers (rugby union) (born 1969), former Wales international rugby union player
Peter Rogers (cyclist) (born 1974), former Australian professional road racing cyclist
Pete Rogers, see 1986 British Saloon Car Championship season